Minnesota State Highway 119 (MN 119) is a  state highway in west-central Minnesota, which runs from its intersection with U.S. Highway 212 (US 212) in Dawson and continues north to its northern terminus at its intersection with U.S. Highway 12 (US 12) in Shible Township. The route passes through the city of Appleton.

Route description
MN 119 serves as a north–south route in west-central Minnesota between US 12 and U.S. Highway 212.

MN 119 crosses the Minnesota River and Lac qui Parle Lake at the county line.

The route runs concurrently with US 59 and MN 7 on Munsterman Street through the city of Appleton for 14 blocks.

MN 119 parallels US 75 throughout its route.

The route is legally defined as Route 144 in the Minnesota Statutes. It is not marked with this number.

The highway is also designated Theodore Christianson Memorial Drive.

History
MN 119 was authorized in 1933.

The route was mostly paved by 1940 and completely paved by 1953.

The route was extended south from MN 40 to US 212 in 2017 as part of a road exchange, replacing Lac qui Parle County State-Aid Highway 25. At the same time, Minnesota State Highway 275 was turned back to county control.

Major intersections

References

119
Transportation in Lac qui Parle County, Minnesota
Transportation in Swift County, Minnesota